Richard 'Skip' Daly (born in 1959 in Reno, Nevada) is an American politician and Democratic member of the Nevada Senate representing the 13th district. He previously served in the Nevada Assembly from 2010 until 2014 and again from 2016 to 2020.

Education
Daly earned his AA from Truckee Meadows Community College.

Elections
2016 Daly regains his seat.
2014 Daly loses to opponent Jill Dickman, securing only 7,943 votes (44%) during the November 4, 2014 General Election.
2012 Daly was unopposed for the June 12, 2012 Democratic Primary and won the November 6, 2012 General election with 14,540 votes (52.00%) against Republican nominee David Espinosa.
2010 When Democratic Assemblyman Bernie Anderson retired from the Assembly because he was term limited and left the District 31 seat open, Daly won the three-way June 8, 2010 Democratic Primary with 1,760 votes (75.60%), and won the November 2, 2010 General election with 6,258 votes (56.98%) against Republican nominee Randi Thompson, who had run for the seat in 1998, 2004, and 2006.

References

External links
Official page at the Nevada Legislature
Campaign site
 

Date of birth missing (living people)
1959 births
Living people
Democratic Party members of the Nevada Assembly
Politicians from Reno, Nevada
Politicians from Sparks, Nevada
21st-century American politicians